Graeme Fish (born August 23, 1997) is a Canadian long track speed skater who specializes in the long-distance events.

On February 13, 2020, he won a bronze medal at the 2020 World Single Distances Speed Skating Championships at the Utah Olympic Oval in Salt Lake City, United States.

The next day he won the gold medal in the 10,000 meters in a new world record of 12:33.86, becoming the first man from outside the Netherlands to win gold in this distance event in the 20 times it has been held at the worlds. He overtook the 2015 record set by his compatriot and mentor Ted-Jan Bloemen who finished second.

Personal records

References

External links

1997 births
Living people
Canadian male speed skaters
Sportspeople from Moose Jaw
World Single Distances Speed Skating Championships medalists
Olympic speed skaters of Canada
Speed skaters at the 2022 Winter Olympics
21st-century Canadian people